Hikmat Sulayman (1889 – 16 June 1964) was prime minister of Iraq from October 30, 1936 to August 12, 1937 at the head of a Party of National Brotherhood government.

Sulayman, of Iraqi Arab, Circassian and Georgian descent,  was a key figure in the early days of Iraqi independence and the effort to create a multi-ethnic state. He came to power in Bakr Sidqi's coup, the first that the country experienced. His position was confirmed by King Ghazi.

He was president of the Chamber of Deputies in 1926. Together with Sidqi, Sulayman veered away from the pan-Arab nationalism of the preceding Iraqi governments. Together with Sidqi, he forged an alliance with Turkey and settled the border dispute with Iran, two countries he regarded as potential allies in the struggle against Arab nationalist sentiment. Nevertheless, he differed with Sidqi over the emphases of the new government, preferring to address social issues in the country, while Sidqi focused on military affairs and expanding Iraq's borders.

His political positions 
Sulayman held the following political positions in the Iraqi state:

 He was elected a member of the Iraqi parliament in 1925.
 Then he rose to the position of Minister of Justice and resigned in 1928.
 He was appointed Minister of Knowledge.
 He was appointed Minister of Interior.
 He was the head of the Iraqi parliament.
 He was Prime Minister in the era of the coup of Bakr Sidqi in 1936, and he served as Prime Minister in Iraq from October 30, 1936 to August 12, 1937, and managed the helm of government with unparalleled sincerity. After the coup, he was sentenced to five years' imprisonment, and forced to resign after the assassination of Bakr Sidqi in 1937.

References

Bibliography 
 
 .

1889 births
Prime Ministers of Iraq
Presidents of the Chamber of Deputies of Iraq
Party of National Brotherhood politicians
1964 deaths
Iraqi people of Georgian descent
Iraqi people of Chechen descent
Iraqi people of Circassian descent
Interior ministers of Iraq